Pratesi is an Italian surname. Notable people with the surname include:

 Franco Pratesi (born 1940), Italian scientist and games historian
 Ottavio Pratesi (1889–1977), Italian racing cyclist

Italian-language surnames